Almir de Souza Fraga (born 26 March 1969), known as Almir, is a Brazilian former footballer who played as a striker.

He represented the Brazilian national side in five international games between 1990 and 1993.

Career statistics

Club

International

Honours 
 Grêmio
 Copa do Brasil: 1989

 São Paulo
 Copa Master de CONMEBOL: 1996

 Atlético Mineiro
 Copa Conmebol: 1997
 Copa Centenário de Belo Horizonte: 1997

 Palmeiras
 Copa do Brasil: 1998
 Copa Mercosur: 1998

Sport
 Campeonato Pernambucano: 2000

References

External links
 
 
 
 

1969 births
Living people
Brazilian footballers
Brazilian expatriate footballers
Brazil international footballers
1993 Copa América players
Grêmio Foot-Ball Porto Alegrense players
Santos FC players
São Paulo FC players
Sociedade Esportiva Palmeiras players
Sport Club Internacional players
Querétaro F.C. footballers
Atlas F.C. footballers
Gaziantepspor footballers
Associação Desportiva São Caetano players
Mogi Mirim Esporte Clube players
Expatriate footballers in Japan
Expatriate footballers in Mexico
Expatriate footballers in Turkey
Campeonato Brasileiro Série A players
Süper Lig players
Liga MX players
J1 League players
Shonan Bellmare players
Association football forwards
Footballers from Porto Alegre